Bad Düben, until 1948 Düben is a town in the district of Nordsachsen in Saxony in Germany. It is situated at the southern end of the Düben Heath Nature Park (Düben Heath), between the rivers Elbe and Mulde, which runs through the city center.

History

Bad Düben's history goes back at least 1,000 years and traces its origins to the Slavic castle of Dibni, with the first documented mention in 981. Fortifications around the castle led in time to the formation of the town at the Mulde. The town was the site of several historical events, including a battle in 1450 in the feud between Friedrich and Wilhelm von Thüringen, in which the old castle was completely destroyed. The legendary dispute between Hans Kohlhase and Günter von Zaschnitz was settled in a court established in the town in 1533.

In 1631, during the Thirty Years' War Gustav Adolf II and John George I, Elector of Saxony met in the town to forge an alliance against Ferdinand II, Holy Roman Emperor.

In 1948, the town of Düben was awarded the title of "Bad", which means spa.

Personalities who have worked locally

 Bärbel Wachholz (1938-1984), DDR-pop singer
 Christoph Hein (born 1944), author and honorary citizen, grew up in the city
 Elke Dopp (born 1965), professor of hygiene and environmental medicine, born in Bad Düben
 Norman Liebold (born 1976), author, artist and actor, went to school in Bad Duben

References 

Nordsachsen
Spa towns in Germany